E. Roger Mitchell (born February 18, 1971) is an American actor. He has had several major roles, including Chaff in Hunger Games: Catching Fire (2013), Detective Sergeant Morris in American Woman (2018), and Paul on The Walking Dead; as well as television roles on The Shield, One Tree Hill, and as Carlton Pettiway on The Quad.

Early life

Mitchell was born in Miami, Florida. He graduated in 1993 from Claflin University in South Carolina with B.A.s in English and Drama. He was named in the Who's Who Among Americas Colleges and Universities in 1992. Mitchell later studied at Alliance Theatre Professional Actor Internship and earned a Master of Fine Arts from City University of New York's Brooklyn campus in 1999.

Career
Mitchell began his acting career in 1997 with his role in the film Raney. The same year, he went on to play Joseph in the comedy film How I Spent My Summer Vacation. In 2000, he portrayed the character Aaron in the film The Legend of Bagger Vance, featuring Will Smith, Charlize Theron and Matt Damon. In 2013, he appeared as Chaff in The Hunger Games: Catching Fire. In 2017, he appeared as Agent Craig McCall in the autobiographical drama film American Made, featuring Tom Cruise, Domhnall Gleeson, Sarah Wright, Jesse Plemmons, Jayma Mays and Alejandro Edda, which is distributed by Universal Pictures and directed by Doug Liman.

He has also made guest appearances on several television shows, including NCIS, House of Payne, Past Life, Nashville, Drop Dead Diva, The Rickey Smiley Show, Being Mary Jane, Survivor's Remorse, and Powers.

Filmography

Film/Movie

Television

References

External links

YouTube interview by TSC News

American male film actors
American male television actors
Male actors from Miami
Claflin University alumni
20th-century American male actors
21st-century American male actors
African-American male actors
Living people
1971 births
20th-century African-American people
21st-century African-American people